Ground control may refer to:

Aviation and spaceflight 
 Air traffic control, in charge of the controlled areas on an airport
 Mission control center, such as the one at Johnson Space Center, responsible for spaceflight
 UAV ground control station

Entertainment 
 187 Lockdown, a 1990s British electronic duo that released under the name GroundControl
 Ground Control (video game), a 2000 computer game by Massive Entertainment
Ground Control: Dark Conspiracy, 2000 expansion pack for Ground Control
 Ground Control II: Operation Exodus, a 2004 video game
 Ground Control (film), a 1998 film starring Kiefer Sutherland
 Ground Control (album), a 2021 album by English band Rudimental

Other uses 
 The application of rock mechanics to tunneling and underground mining operations